Islam at the Crossroads is a book written by Muhammad Asad. The book originally published in Delhi and Lahore in 1934, and was later reprinted by Dar Al-Andulas in 1982 with an additional note by the author.

The book is basically a plea to Muslims to avoid blind imitation of Western social forms and values, and to try to preserve instead their Islamic heritage  which once upon a time had been responsible for the glorious, many-sided historical phenomenon comprised in the term "Muslim civilization". Asad dedicates the book to "the Muslim youth of today in hopes that it may be of benefit."

See also
 Timeline of Muhammad Asad's life
 The Message of The Qur'an
 The Road to Mecca
 This Law of Ours and Other Essays
 The Principles of State and Government in Islam

References

External links
 Islam at the Crossroads()
 Review by Goodreads.com
 Review by TheCanadianCharger.com

1982 non-fiction books
Books about Islam and society
Sharia
Contemporary Islamic philosophy
Muhammad Asad
20th-century philosophy